Gilles Carrez (born 29 August 1948 in Paris) is a French politician of the Republicans who serves as a member of the National Assembly of France, representing the Val-de-Marne's 5th constituency.

He is not standing for re-election in the 2022 French legislative election.

Political positions
Carrez is the author of the 1996 Carrez law which obliges the vendor of a property lot (or fraction of a lot) in a condominium to specifically mention the surface area in all documents relating to the property sold.

In response to a 2019 law authorizing the sale of the government's controlling stake in Groupe ADP, Carrez supported a cross-party initiative which called for a referendum to overturn the legislation, citing concerns over the loss of government revenue and influence.

Controversy
In October 2014, Carrez was found to have avoided paying the French solidarity tax on wealth (ISF) for three years by applying a 30 percent tax allowance on one of his homes.  However, he had previously converted the home into an SCI, a private, limited company to be used for rental purposes. The 30 percent allowance does not apply to SCI holdings. Once this was revealed, Carrez declared, "if the tax authorities think that I should pay the wealth tax, I won't argue." At the time, Carrez was one of more than 60 French parliamentarians battling with the tax offices over 'dodgy' asset declarations.

References

1948 births
Living people
HEC Paris alumni
École nationale d'administration alumni
Politicians from Paris
Rally for the Republic politicians
Union for a Popular Movement politicians
The Republicans (France) politicians
Mayors of places in Île-de-France
Deputies of the 12th National Assembly of the French Fifth Republic
Deputies of the 13th National Assembly of the French Fifth Republic
Deputies of the 14th National Assembly of the French Fifth Republic
Deputies of the 15th National Assembly of the French Fifth Republic